Zarif is a surname and may refer to:

 Mohammad Javad Zarif (born 1960), Iranian former foreign minister
 Houshang Zarif (1938–2020), Iranian master musician and renowned tar player
 Farhad Zarif (born 1983), Iranian volleyball player
 Munawar Zarif (1940–1976), Pakistani comedian and film actor
 Farid Zarif (born 1951), United Nations Secretary-General Ban Ki-moon’s Special Representative
 Omar Zarif (born 1978), Argentine football midfielder
 Jorge Zarif (born 1992), Brazilian sailor
 Hajji Muhammad Arif Zarif (1942–2007), Afghan politician